Thomas Zacharias may refer to:
Thomas Zacharias (baseball) (died 1892), American baseball umpire
Thomas Zacharias (high jumper) (born 1947), German high jumper